The Pamir-Alay (also Pamiro-Alay) is a mountain system in Tajikistan, Kyrgyzstan and Uzbekistan, encompassing four main mountain ranges extending west from the Tian Shan Mountains, and located north of the main range of Pamir. They are variously considered part of the Tian Shan, of the Pamir, or a separate mountain system. The term "Pamiro-Alay" is also used to refer to the mountain region encompassing the Pamir, the Pamir-Alay proper (then referred to as "Gissaro-Alay") and the Tajik Depression.

The Pamir-Alay stretches between the valleys of the rivers Syr Darya (Fergana Valley) to its north and Vakhsh to its south. Its highest summit is Pik Skalisty ("rocky peak"), 5621 m, in the Turkestan Range. The Pamir-Alay is about 900 km long in west–east direction, and up to 150 km wide in the Western part.

Main subranges
The Pamir-Alay is subdivided into the following mountain ranges:
Turkestan Range (5,621 m)
Alay Range (5,544 m)
Zarafshan Range (5,489 m), including Fann Mountains
Gissar Range (4,643 m), including Köýtendag Range

References

External links

Mountain ranges of Tajikistan
Mountain ranges of Kyrgyzstan
Mountain ranges of Uzbekistan
Pamir Mountains